Vernon is an unincorporated town, a post office, and a census-designated place (CDP) located in and governed by Yuma County, Colorado, United States. The Vernon post office has the ZIP Code 80755. At the United States Census 2010, the population of the Vernon CDP was 29, while the population of the 80755 ZIP Code Tabulation Area was 163 including adjacent areas.

History
The Vernon Post Office has been in operation since 1892. The community was named after a local minister with the name Vernon.

Geography

Demographics

See also

Outline of Colorado
Index of Colorado-related articles
State of Colorado
Colorado cities and towns
Colorado census designated places
Colorado counties
Yuma County, Colorado

References

External links

A busy day in Vernon
Yuma County website

Census-designated places in Yuma County, Colorado
Census-designated places in Colorado